Red Wing or Red Wing Creek structure is a meteor crater located in 

The crater is not exposed to the surface, but was discovered using seismic techniques, and the structure has produced oil since its discovery in 1972.

History 
The Red Wing Creek structure shows up well in seismic studies.  The underlying Ordovician rocks are overlain by disturbed Devonian and Mississippian rocks.  The structural disturbance is filled by thick rocks of Jurassic age, suggesting that the impact took place during the Triassic.

Shell Oil Company drilled exploratory wells on the Red Wing Creek structure in 1965 and 1968. These wells did not find oil, but did indicate very thick sections of Mississippian and Pennsylvanian rocks. In 1972, True Oil Company drilled a well that discovered oil. This thick oil column was because the rocks were tilted on their sides.

The discovery of oil led to intense geological and geophysical studies of the Red Wing Creek area.  In 1996, Christian Koeberl and his colleagues discovered planar deformation features (PDFs) in samples from two oil wells at the center of the structure.  This provided unambiguous evidence for shock metamorphism, and confirmed the impact origin of the Red Wing Creek structure.

Hypothetical multiple impact event 

It has been suggested by Geophysicist David Rowley of the University of Chicago, working with John Spray of the University of New Brunswick and Simon Kelley of the Open University, that the Red Wing crater may have been part of a hypothetical multiple impact event which also formed the Manicouagan impact structure in northern Quebec, Rochechouart impact structure in France, Saint Martin crater in Manitoba, and Obolon' crater in Ukraine. All of the craters had previously been known and studied, but their paleoalignment had never before been demonstrated. Rowley has said that the chance that these craters could be aligned like this due to chance are nearly zero.

References

External links 
 Aerial exploration of the Red Wing crater

Impact craters of the United States
Landforms of North Dakota
Landforms of McKenzie County, North Dakota
Triassic impact craters
Jurassic impact craters